Weda is a district in North Maluku, Indonesia, located on the east coast of Halmahera, the largest of the Maluku Islands. The district includes 24 small offshore islands. Its administrative centre is the village of Were, which is also the capital of the Central Halmahera Regency. The Sawai language is spoken in Weda.

Weda has an eco resort that is focused on maintaining the fragile ecology of the area. They provide diving packages and snorkeling excursions to visitors. Weda Resort provides birdwatching, in great comfort, from the terrace of the resort. Weda is one of the most interesting birdwatching destinations in Indonesia. Nearby are the Boki Maruru caves, Nusliko ponds, and other areas of interest.

Climate
Weda has a tropical rainforest climate (Af) with moderate rainfall in October and November and heavy rainfall in the remaining months.

References

Populated places in North Maluku
Regency seats of North Maluku